Australia competed at the 1932 Summer Olympics in Los Angeles, United States. Due to the Great Depression, Australia could only afford to send 13 athletes to the Games.

An innovation was the daily one-hour radio report on the Olympics for New Zealand and Australia by the film actress from New Zealand, Nola Luxford.

Medalists

Gold
Dunc Gray – cycling, men's 1000 m time trial
Bobby Pearce – rowing, men's single sculls
Clare Dennis – swimming, women's 200 m breaststroke

Silver
Bonnie Mealing – swimming, women's 100 m backstroke

Bronze
Eddie Scarf – wrestling, men's freestyle light heavyweight

Athletics

Key
Note–Ranks given for track events are within the athlete's heat only
Q = Qualified for the next round
q = Qualified for the next round as a fastest loser or, in field events, by position without achieving the qualifying target
NR = National record
N/A = Round not applicable for the event
Bye = Athlete not required to compete in round
NP = Not placed

Men
Track & road events

Women
Track & road events

Cycling

Track cycling
Ranks given are within the heat.

Rowing

Swimming

Men
Ranks given are within the heat.

Women
Ranks given are within the heat.

Wrestling

Freestyle wrestling
 Men's

Art competitions

James Quinn competed in the mixed paintings category.

References

Nations at the 1932 Summer Olympics
1932
Olympics